Pillingsdorf is a village and a former municipality in the district Saale-Orla-Kreis, in Thuringia, Germany. Since 1 January 2012, it is part of the town Triptis.

References

Former municipalities in Thuringia